= Cirkevná spojená škola Humenné =

Coordinates: 48°56′13″N 21°54′53″E

Cirkevná spojená škola
- Cirkevná spojená škola Humenné (Slovakia)
- Humenné; Slovakia

Information
- Type: catholic school
- Established: 1992.09.01
- Principal: Mgr. Marianna Harvanová
- Website: https://gymazshe.edupage.org

Cirkevná spojená škola Humenné is a Roman catholic school. The institution comprises three schools: Nursery school of St. Thérèse of Lisieux , Primary school of Sts. Cyril and Methodius and Grammar school of Sts. Cyril and Methodius (a four-year study programme and an eight-year study programme).

== Nursery school of St. Thérèse of Lisieux ==
Since 5 Sep 2016 Cirkevná spojená škola Humenné comprises Nursery school of St. Thérèse of Lisieux.
